Eduardo R. Ermita (born July 13, 1935) is a former Executive Secretary of the Philippines and former spokesperson for President Gloria Macapagal Arroyo. Ermita took his Defense Resource Management Course at the Naval Postgraduate School, Monterey, California, U.S.A. from 1978 to 1979; Command and General Staff Course, Fort Bonifacio in 1974; Unit Psychological Officers Course, Kennedy Center, Fort Bragg, North Carolina, U.S.A. from 1970 to 1971; Special Forces Course, Fort Magsaysay from 1962 to 1963; Counterintelligence Course, Special Intelligence School, Fort Bonifacio in 1962; Airborne School, Fort Benning, Georgia, U.S.A. in 1961; and Ranger School, Fort Benning, Georgia from 1960 to 1961.

Ermita was a three-term congressman, defeating one of the most influential political families in the 1st District of Batangas from 1992 to 2001. He was appointed on October 3, 2003, as Secretary of National Defense. He is the provincial chairman  of Lakas-CMD in Batangas and regional chairman of Lakas-CMD in Calabarzon since 1992.

He was the Deputy Chief of Staff of the Armed Forces of the Philippines during the series of coup attempts from 1986 to 1988, Undersecretary of National Defense during the last major coup attempt in December 1989, head of the Special Information group during the EDSA People Power Revolution in February 1986, and president of the Philippine Military Academy Alumni Association from 1986 to 1988.

Ermita is married to Elvira Ramos from Dipolog, with whom he has four children, including former Batangas representative Eileen Ermita-Buhain.

References

1935 births
Living people
Arroyo administration cabinet members
Executive Secretaries of the Philippines
Filipino military personnel
Grand Crosses of the Order of Lakandula
Lakas–CMD politicians
Lakas–CMD (1991) politicians
Members of the House of Representatives of the Philippines from Batangas
People from Batangas
Philippine Army personnel
Philippine Military Academy alumni
Presidential Advisers on the Peace Process of the Philippines
Presidential spokespersons (Philippines)
Secretaries of National Defense of the Philippines